This is a list of known submarines of the Indian Navy, grouped by class, and pennant numbers within the class.

In service

Under construction

Planned

Decommissioned

See also 

 Indian navy related lists
 Aircraft of the Indian Navy
 List of active Indian Navy ships
 List of Indian naval aircraft
 List of Indian Navy bases
 List of ships of the Indian Navy

 Indian military related 
 India-China Border Roads
 Indian military satellites
 List of active Indian military aircraft
 List of Indian Air Force stations
 India's overseas military bases
 Indian Nuclear Command Authority

Notes

References

External links 

 THE SUBMARINE ARMsam
 Cruise control

 
Indian Navy
Submarines